Tătaru is a commune in Prahova County.

Tătaru may also refer to:

Places in Romania
Tătaru, a village in Dudeşti Commune, Brăila County
Tătaru, a village in Comana Commune, Constanţa County
Tătaru, a village in Poiana Stampei Commune, Suceava County
Tătaru, a village in Măicănești Commune, Vrancea County

Other uses
Tătaru (surname)
Tătaru Mare Island
Tătaru River (disambiguation)

See also 
 Tătărăni, Vaslui County, Western Moldavia, Romania
 Tătărani,Dâmbovița County, Muntenia, Romania
 Tătărășeni (disambiguation)
 Tătărăști, Bacău County, Western Moldavia, Romania
 Tătărăștii (disambiguation)
 Tătărești (disambiguation)